Deniska may refer to:

 A diminutive of the female given name Denisa used in Czech and Slovak 
 A diminutive of the male given name Denis used in Russia
 Jiří Procházka, a Czech martial artist known as Deniska or Denisa

See also

 Denni (disambiguation)